Nicholson may refer to:

People
Nicholson (name), a surname, and a list of people with the name

Places

Australia
 Nicholson, Victoria
 Nicholson, Queensland
 Nicholson County, New South Wales
 Nicholson River (disambiguation)
 Nicholson Road, Perth
 Nicholson Street, Melbourne

Hong Kong
 Mount Nicholson, Hong Kong Island

New Zealand
 Port Nicholson, former name of Wellington Harbour, New Zealand

United States
 Nicholson, Georgia
 Nicholson Island (Pennsylvania)
 Nicholson, Mississippi
 Nicholson, Pennsylvania
 Nicholson, Wisconsin
 Nicholson Township, Fayette County, Pennsylvania
 Nicholson Township, Wyoming County, Pennsylvania
 Dr. Malcolm Nicholson Farmhouse, a historic farmhouse in Havana, Florida

Craters
Nicholson crater, in Canada
Nicholson (lunar crater)
Nicholson (Martian crater)

Other uses
 Crest Nicholson, British housebuilding company
 Fanny Nicholson, Australian sailing ship that sank in 1874
 Nicholson's, a brewery in Maidenhead from 1840-1960
 Nicholson v. Haldimand-Norfolk Reg. Police Commrs., Supreme Court of Canada decision
 USS Nicholson, several ships in the United States Navy
 Nicholson Guides, a range of maps of United Kingdom inland waterways
 Nicholson & Co Ltd, builder of church organs, Worcester, England, since 1841

See also 
 Nicolson
 Justice Nicholson (disambiguation)